Zhang Zairong (張 載榮, born ) is a Chinese male former weightlifter, who competed in the flyweight class and represented China at international competitions. He won the bronze medal at the 1990 and 1991 World Weightlifting Championships in the 52 kg category. He participated at the 1992 Summer Olympics in the 52 kg event. He set one flyweight snatch world record at the 1991 World Championships (120.5 kg).

References

External links
 

1969 births
Living people
Chinese male weightlifters
World Weightlifting Championships medalists
Place of birth missing (living people)
Olympic weightlifters of China
Weightlifters at the 1992 Summer Olympics
World record holders in Olympic weightlifting
20th-century Chinese people